Ziguinchor University or  is located in Ziguinchor, Casamance, Senegal. It was founded in 2007.

References

External links 
Université de Ziguinchor Official Website

Universities in Senegal
French West Africa
Educational institutions established in 2007
2007 establishments in Senegal